Yadav Chandra Sharma is a current Governor of Bagmati Province. He was appointed as the governor per Article 163 (2) of the Constitution of Nepal by the president Bidya Devi Bhandari on the recommendation of the Council of Ministers of the Government of Nepal on 20 August 2021. He was personal secretary of Madhav Kumar Nepal when Nepal was Prime Minister.

See also
 Bagmati Province
 Governor (Nepal)

References

Communist Party of Nepal (Unified Socialist) politicians
People from Makwanpur District
Living people
Nepal Communist Party (NCP) politicians
Governors of Bagmati Province
Year of birth missing (living people)